Silesian National Publishing House is the first-ever publishing house specializing in producing books in the Silesian language and on all matters (Upper) Silesian. It was founded in 2003 in Zabrze, Poland, where it is registered under the Polish name, Narodowa Oficyna Śląska. Its owner and founder, Andrzej Roczniok was the initiator of to the codification of the Silesian language, and remains the main contributor to this process. He also applied for an ISO 639-3 code for Silesian, which was granted as szl in 2007. In the same year the Ślōnsko Nacyjno Ôficyno began publishing the first-ever periodical in Silesian and Polish, Ślůnsko Nacyjo (Silesian Nation). The publishing house's bestseller has been Dariusz Jerczyński’s extensive monograph, Historia Narodu Śląskiego (A History of the Silesian Nation, 2003), which actually commenced the publishing activities of the Ślōnsko Nacyjno Ôficyno.

References

External links
 Ślōnsko Nacyjno Ôficyno – archiwum, narodowaoficynaslaska.friko.pl
 Publikacyje ôd Ślōnskij Nacyjnyj Ôficyny, silesiana.sellingo.pl

Book publishing companies of Poland
Mass media in Zabrze
Silesian language